The Hippocratic bench or scamnum was a device invented by Hippocrates (c. 460 BC–380 BC), which used tension to aid in setting bones. It is a forerunner of the traction devices used in modern orthopedics, as well as of the rack, an instrument of torture.

The patient would lie on a bench, at an adjustable angle, and ropes would be tied around their arms, waist, legs or feet, depending on the treatment needed. Winches would then be used to pull the ropes apart, correcting curvature in the spine or separating an overlapping fracture.

In recent years, a similar non-surgical procedure known as VAX-D (short for Vertebral Axial Decompression) has been developed for treating certain patients with lower back pain. Patients undergoing VAX-D are fitted with a special pelvic harness and then placed on the VAX-D table. The device then applies controlled tension along the axis of the spinal column, while the harness assists in providing decompression of the lumbar spine. The decompression process is controlled by computer program with supervision by a human technician. The VAX-D process is claimed to be useful in treating cases of sciatica, degenerative disc disease, and herniated discs.

References
 "What the Ancients Did for Us", BBC television programme aired on April 6, 2005

Ancient inventions
Ancient Greek medicine
Orthopedic surgical procedures